Parliamentary elections were held in Hungary on 25 March 1990, with a second round of voting taking place in all but five single member constituencies on 8 April. They were the first completely free and competitive elections to be held in the country since 1945, and only the second completely free elections with universal suffrage in the country's history. The conservative, nationalist Hungarian Democratic Forum (MDF) beat the liberal and more internationalist Alliance of Free Democrats, which had spearheaded opposition to Communist rule in 1989, to become the largest party in parliament.  The Hungarian Socialist Party, the former Communist party, suffered a crushing defeat, winning only 33 seats for fourth place.

MDF leader József Antall became prime minister in coalition with the Christian Democratic People's Party and Independent Smallholders' Party. It was the first government since the end of World War II with no Communist participation.

Background

Hungary's transition to a Western-style democracy was one of the smoothest among the former Soviet bloc. By late 1988, activists within the party and bureaucracy and Budapest-based intellectuals were increasing pressure for change. Some of these became reformist social democrats, while others began movements which were to develop into parties. Young liberals formed the Federation of Young Democrats (Fidesz); a core from the so-called Democratic Opposition formed the Association of Free Democrats (SZDSZ), and the national opposition established the Hungarian Democratic Forum (MDF).

Among the organized opposition, Round Table Talks began in March 1989, a series of formalized, orderly and highly legalistic discussions, inspired by the Polish model. At that point, longtime leader János Kádár had been removed from power for almost a year, and the Communists' Central Committee that month admitted the necessity of a multiparty system, with various groups like Fidesz and the Alliance of Free Democrats (SZDSZ) having emerged.  Mass demonstrations on March 15, the National Day, persuaded the regime to begin negotiations with the emergent non-Communist political forces. A week later, these new movements, at the initiative of the Independent Lawyers’ Forum, formed the Opposition Round Table (Ellenzéki Kerekasztal, EKA), designed to prevent the Communists from trying to maintain power by dividing the opposition, and to establish some degree of unity in the face of the regime's own reform agenda.  The table was composed of a small number of elite organizations, whose grassroots links were poorly developed and whose very existence stemmed in part from the collaboration of key Communist reformers. Specifically, it involved the SZDSZ, Fidesz, the Hungarian Democratic Forum (MDF), the Independent Smallholders’ Party (FKGP), the Hungarian People's Party (MNP), the Endre Bajcsy-Zsilinszky Society, and the Democratic Trade Union of Scientific Workers. At a later stage the Democratic Confederation of Free Trade Unions and the Christian Democratic People's Party (KNDP) were invited.

In July 1989, four by-elections took place in Gödöllő, Szeged, Kecskemét and Kiskunfélegyháza. In these elections SZDSZ, FKGP and Fidesz supported one single candidate from MDF in each constituency. In first three seats MDF candidates came first.

In October 1989, the ruling Communist Hungarian Socialist Workers' Party (MSZMP) convened its last congress and re-established itself as the Hungarian Socialist Party (MSZP), which branded itself as a Western European-style social democratic party. In a historic session from 16 October to 20 October, the parliament adopted legislation providing for multi-party parliamentary elections and a direct presidential election. The legislation changed Hungary's official name from the People's Republic of Hungary to the Republic of Hungary, guaranteed human and civil rights, and created an institutional structure that ensured separation of powers among the judicial, legislative, and executive branches of government.

An agreement was reached involving six draft laws that covered an overhaul of the Constitution, establishment of a Constitutional Court, the functioning and management of political parties, multiparty elections for National Assembly deputies, the penal code and the law on penal procedures (the last two changes represented an additional separation of the Party from the state apparatus).

The electoral system was a compromise: initially it proposed that 222 deputies would be elected proportionally and 152 deputies by the majoritarian system. Overall, National Assembly would have had 374 deputies, but it was agreed to have 386 deputies (down by one).

A weak presidency was also agreed upon, but no consensus was attained on who should elect the president (parliament or the people) and when this election should occur (before or after parliamentary elections). Initially, the opposition was united in wanting the president elected by parliament after new elections to ensure parliamentary supremacy and minimise the MSZMP's power. Then, faced with Communist concessions, the relatively weak opposition split, as at least three moderate groups (including KNDP and MDF) signed the Round Table agreement and implicitly accepted Pozsgay as president while the radicals (notably Fidesz and the SZDSZ) refused to do so. After a burst of negotiations, fully free elections were scheduled for March 1990, in contrast to the semi-free elections held in Poland in June 1989.

Electoral system
Of the 386 seats in the National Assembly, 176 were elected from single member constituencies, 120 from multi-member constituencies and a further 90 from "compensatory" national seats.

Results

Notes

References

Sources

 .
 .
 .
 .
 .

External links
Elections to the Hungarian National Assembly - Results Lookup Election Resources 
Hungary: Parliamentary Chamber: Orszaggyules: Elections held in 1990 Inter-Parliamentary Union

Hungary
Parliamentary
Aftermath of the Revolutions of 1989
Elections in Hungary
Hungary
Hungary